Ekrem Bora (born 3 September 1983), better known by his stage name Eko Fresh, is a German rapper of Turkish and Kurdish descent.

Biography
Bora was born in Cologne and grew up in Mönchengladbach, raised by his single mother, a postal worker.  He began rapping at age 14 and eventually dropped out of school in tenth grade. Afterwards, he started working in a shoe store to make ends meet. While working his retail gig, Bora met Kool Savas, who agreed to produce his 2001 Royal Bunker debut EP, "Jetzt kommen wir auf die Sachen".

The German Stampede Wrestling, a professional wrestling promotion based in Cologne, featured Bora. He had wrestling matches in promotional events including Night in Motion X, Southern Conflict II, X-Limits, Battlefield 2008, and Northern Night since 2007.

Beginning in 2010, Eko Fresh began an extremely prolific run, releasing four new albums over a three year span. In 2013, he delivered the wildly successful Eksodus which topped the charts in Germany and reached the top ten in Austria and Switzerland as well.

Feuds with other rappers

In 2004, Eko Fresh started a feud with his song "Die Abrechnung", where he criticized his former mentors Kool Savas, Optik Records, Bushido and Aggro Berlin. The song was released on 23 December 2004 on Juice CD # 49 and is a diss track against various other rappers, including his former mentor Kool Savas. With the track billing in which he attacked Savas and Optik Records, he laid the foundation for the battle. Savas is suppressing his labelmates and MOR, Sava's former crew, would also have disintegrated for this reason, the statement said. The Berlin label Aggro and Bushido are also dissected in the track. However, he overdid it a little, which Sava's answer track quickly clarified the verdict. Many rappers replied to "Die Abrechnung", including Illmatic with "4Eko" and Fler with "Hollywoodtürke". Rappers from Optik Records also reacted: Caput with "Ich geb n fuck" and Ercandize with "Verdanken".

Discography 

Eko Fresh has released 10 studio albums, two collaboration albums, three extended tracks, three compilation albums, 18 singles (including three singles as featured artist) and 45 free tracks.

Studio albums

Compilation albums

Singles
As lead artist

Collaboration singles

Free tracks

References

External links 
Official website

1983 births
Living people
German people of Turkish descent
German people of Kurdish descent
Musicians from Cologne
People from Mönchengladbach
German rappers
Turkish rappers
Discographies of German artists
Hip hop discographies